Parcoul-Chenaud is a commune in the Dordogne department of southwestern France. The municipality was established on 1 January 2016 and consists of the former communes of Parcoul and Chenaud.

See also 
Communes of the Dordogne department

References 

Communes of Dordogne